Icelastatis galerucoides is a species of beetle in the family Cerambycidae, and the only species in the genus Icelastatis. It was described by Henry Walter Bates in 1866.

References

Calliini
Beetles described in 1866
Monotypic beetle genera